The Australasian Performing Right Association Awards of 1984 (generally known as APRA Awards) are a series of awards held in 1984. The APRA Music Awards were presented by Australasian Performing Right Association (APRA) and the Australasian Mechanical Copyright Owners Society (AMCOS). There were no awards presented in 1983: while the inaugural ceremony occurred in 1982.

Awards 

Only winners are noted

See also 

 Music of Australia

References

External links 

 APRA official website

1984 in Australian music
1984 music awards
APRA Awards